Dakota Express is a 2002 Kannada-language comedy film, a remake of the 2001 Malayalam film Ee Parakkum Thalika. It was produced by Rockline Venkatesh and directed by M. S. Rajashekar. The film stars Rockline Venkatesh and Om Prakash Rao.

Plot
Krishna owns an old bus and he is facing lot of problems due to the pathetic condition of the bus. He sold many valuable things to maintain this bus. His friend Sundar was his only companion. A mouse was also there as a character. It ate the passport of Sundar and Sundar went after that mouse. The story took a turn when Gayathri entered the bus as a nomad. She was actually the daughter of a minister. Her father forced her to join politics. So she left home. The police traced her out and had taken her back. Her father was making arrangements for her marriage with someone else. Meanwhile, Krishna realised that he cannot live without Gayathri. Krishna and Sundar secretly entered her house and finally all ended well by winning the heart of her father.

Cast
 Rockline Venkatesh as Krishna
 Om Prakash Rao as Sundar
 Amrutha as Gayathri devi 
 Doddanna as Circle Inspector Ugra narasimha 
 Lokanath as Bank Manager Gundurao 
 Malathi Sardeshpande
 Shivadwaj Shetty 
 M. S. Umesh
Shivaji Rao Jadhav 
Ashok as Home Minister Rajashekhar Patil 
Shyam Yadav as Kashi 
Sarigama Viji as Bhatta 
Rathnakar 
Bangalore Nagesh 
 Mimicry Dayanand

Soundtrack

The music was composed and written by Hamsalekha.

See also
 Ee Parakkum Thalika
 Sundara Travels

Notes

References

External links 
 

Kannada remakes of Malayalam films
2002 films
2000s Kannada-language films
Films scored by Hamsalekha
Indian comedy films
2002 comedy films
Films directed by M. S. Rajashekar